Gyanendra Kumar Singh, also known as Gyanu, is an Indian politician, currently a member of BJP and four time Member Of Legislative Assembly from Barh (Vidhan Sabha constituency). The first two elections he won as a Janata Dal (United) candidate and the last two as BJP candidate.

Recently he questioned BJP state leadership and accused party ministers of taking bribes.

References 

Living people
1959 births
Bihar MLAs 2020–2025
Bharatiya Janata Party politicians from Bihar